"Everything in My Heart" is a song by Canadian singer Corey Hart. It was released in November 1985 as the third single from his second album, Boy in the Box. The song was number-one for one week in Canada but only reached number 30 on the Billboard Hot 100.

Music video
The music video was directed by Rob Quartly and was filmed in Boston.

Charts

References

1985 singles
1985 songs
Corey Hart (singer) songs
Aquarius Records (Canada) singles
EMI America Records singles
RPM Top Singles number-one singles
Songs written by Corey Hart (singer)